Lyberis Stergidis (born 11 February 1987) is a Greek professional footballer who plays as a midfielder for Super League 2 club Panachaiki.

External links
 

1987 births
Living people
Greek footballers
Greek expatriate footballers
Association football midfielders
Thermaikos F.C. players
Panachaiki F.C. players
Niki Volos F.C. players
PAE Kerkyra players
ASIL Lysi players
Nafpaktiakos Asteras F.C. players
Kalamata F.C. players
Ionikos F.C. players
Panserraikos F.C. players
Greek expatriate sportspeople in Cyprus
Expatriate footballers in Cyprus
Footballers from Thessaloniki